The siege of Taormina in 962 was a successful siege by the Fatimid governors of Sicily of the main Byzantine fortress on the island, Taormina.

Siege
The siege was led by the Kalbid cousins Ahmad ibn al-Hasan al-Kalbi and al-Hasan ibn Ammar, and lasted for thirty weeks, until the city's fall on Christmas Day 962. 1,570 of the inhabitants (approximately one-fifth of the population) went as slaves to the Fatimid Caliph al-Mu'izz; the town was renamed al-Mu'izziyya, and Muslim settlers were brought in.

Aftermath
Followed by the Fatimid victories in the siege of Rometta and the Battle of the Straits in 964–965, the fall of Taormina marked the end of the last Byzantine footholds on Sicily, and the final completion of the Muslim conquest of Sicily.

References

Sources
 
 

960s in the Byzantine Empire
962
960s conflicts
Sicily under the Fatimid Caliphate
Taormina 962
Muslim conquest of Sicily
Taormina